Thallarcha is a genus of moths in the subfamily Arctiinae.

Species
Thallarcha albicollis (R. Felder & Rogenhofer, 1875)
Thallarcha catasticta Lower, 1915
Thallarcha chrysochares Meyrick, 1886
Thallarcha chrysochoa (Meyrick, 1886)
Thallarcha cosmodes Turner, 1940
Thallarcha epicela Turner, 1922
Thallarcha epigypsa (Lower, 1902)
Thallarcha epileuca Turner, 1922
Thallarcha epiostola Turner, 1926
Thallarcha eremicola Pescott, 1951
Thallarcha erotis Turner, 1914
Thallarcha fusa Hampson, 1900
Thallarcha homoschema Turner, 1940
Thallarcha isophragma (Meyrick, 1886)
Thallarcha jocularis (Rosenstock, 1885)
Thallarcha lechrioleuca Turner, 1940
Thallarcha leptographa Turner, 1899
Thallarcha levis Turner, 1943
Thallarcha lochaga (Meyrick, 1886)
Thallarcha macilenta (T.P. Lucas, 1894)
Thallarcha mochlina (Turner, 1899)
Thallarcha oblita (R. Felder & Rogenhofer, 1875)
Thallarcha partita (Walker, 1869)
Thallarcha pellax Turner, 1940
Thallarcha phalarota Meyrick, 1886
Thallarcha polystigma Turner, 1943
Thallarcha rhaptophora Lower, 1915
Thallarcha sparsana (Walker, 1863)
Thallarcha staurocola (Meyrick, 1886)
Thallarcha stramenticolor Turner, 1940
Thallarcha trissomochla Turner, 1940
Thallarcha zophophanes Turner, 1940

References
Natural History Museum Lepidoptera generic names catalog

Lithosiini
Moth genera